The Trial of Madame X is a 1948 British drama film directed by Paul England and starring England and Mara Russell-Tavernan. It is based on the 1908 play Madame X by the French playwright Alexandre Bisson (1848-1912).

Plot
A woman is thrown out of her home by her jealous husband and sinks into depravity. Twenty years later, she finds herself accused of murder for saving her son, who does not know who she is. He finds himself defending her without knowing her background.

Cast
 Mara Russell-Tavernan as Jacqueline
 Paul England as Perrisard
 Frank Hawkins as La Roque
 Eddie Leslie as Raymond
 Hamilton Deane as Noel
 Hamilton Keene as Louis
 Jean Le Roy as Madeleine

See also
 Madame X

External links

1948 films
1948 drama films
British black-and-white films
British drama films
British films based on plays
1940s British films